Isles, Inc. is a self-help, urban green development organization in Trenton, New Jersey founded in 1981. Its mission is to foster self-reliant families in healthy, sustainable communities. Isles seeks to train and educate community members, build wealth, and stimulate green, healthy living through a range of programs .

Community served
Despite being New Jersey’s capital city, Trenton’s median household income is $35,259 – more than 50 percent below the median income for Mercer County, New Jersey. According to the New Jersey Department of Labor and Workforce Development data for the month of April 2012, Trenton reports an unemployment rate of 12%, which is significantly higher than the statewide rate of 9.1%. In 2010, the city’s poverty rate was 29.2%, with an additional 3,000 Trenton residents falling into poverty last year.

Recent initiatives and projects
Isles YouthBuild Institute: Isles YouthBuild Institute (IYI) offers alternative education options for at-risk urban students seeking a high school diploma or GED, vocational skills training (construction, computer technology, office management), and life skills training (leadership, financial, health education, conflict management). Isles has developed a peer-based approach for students ages 16 to 24, who have struggled in conventional school settings and/or have had encounters with the justice system. IYI students rehabilitate at least one abandoned home in Trenton each year.
Community Enterprises: Isles Community Enterprises (ICE), a certified Community Development Financial Institute (CDFI), offers educational and financial products, in Spanish and English, that support lower income families pursuing long-term financial stability through homeownership and home preservation counseling, credit repair counseling, and other financial products.
Isles E4: Isles E4 (Energy, Environment, Employment and Equity), is a weatherization and healthy homes subsidiary delivering energy and health retrofits of low-income households in New Jersey.  E4 offers job training for un/underemployed local residents, and weatherization services for lower income communities.

Center for Energy and Environmental Training (CEET): Isles’ CEET is a green collar job training facility targeting careers in clean energy and environmental hazard cleanup. Training modules include energy audits and retrofits, green construction, renewable energy, environmental assessment, and hazardous materials cleanup. CEET is a Building Performance Institute (BPI) certified trainer, and an approved National Center for Healthy Housing satellite training center.
Community Planning and Development: Isles’ Community Planning and Development department teaches residents how to organize, identify, and address immediate land, business, and service needs and opportunities through master planning projects in the region. Currently, Isles is working to renovate an 1800 mill that will become a multi-use center for community and culture in the Trenton area, not far from the well known Grounds for Sculpture.
Urban Agriculture: Isles’ Urban Agriculture work supports Trenton-area residents, schools and other groups to transform vacant urban land into gardens. Through local and national support, such as the Rita Allen Foundation Grant  to promote urban agriculture, Isles supports over 30 community and school gardens in the Trenton area.
Environmental Health: Isles’ Environment Health Department targets the environmental hazards that impact family health and develops cost effective ways to reduce the presence and impact of those hazards. Education programs help families learn about lead and asthma triggers in homes, energy efficiency, how to test for hazards and improve health and quality of life.

Notes

References 
About Isles
Isles Services
Isles Video

External links 
Official Web Site
Founder, President and CEO Marty P. Johnson
Isles on YouTube

Non-profit organizations based in New Jersey
Urban agriculture
Trenton, New Jersey
Urban planning organizations